The Inglorious Bastards is a 1978 Italian Euro War film directed by Enzo G. Castellari and starring Bo Svenson, Peter Hooten, Fred Williamson, Jackie Basehart, and Ian Bannen. The film, which concerns a group of prisoners who are drafted into a special war mission in 1944, is a loose (unauthorized) remake of the 1967 American film The Dirty Dozen.

The film attracted critics' attention again after Quentin Tarantino used the title as the inspiration for the title of his 2009 film Inglourious Basterds. The Tarantino film is not a remake of The Inglorious Bastards, but contains a few references to it, including the appearances of Svenson as an American colonel and Castellari as a Nazi general (although credited as "himself").

Plot
In France in 1944, American soldiers Berle, a deserter; Nick Colasanti, a petty thief; Fred, nicknamed "Assassin"; Tony, a mutineer; and Lieutenant Yeager (arrested for refusing to execute orders to kill, among others, women and children) are sentenced to death for their crimes and are shipped to a prisoners' camp near the Ardennes.

During the journey to the camp, the convoy stops because of a flat tire, and Fred and Berle are ordered to change it. Their work is interrupted by a Luftwaffe air raid. The five criminals take advantage of the attack and escape. Yeager takes command of the group and decides to find a way to neutral Switzerland.

On their way, they stop at an abandoned factory in the French countryside to rest and refill their supplies. While they eat, the upper floor of the building collapses, and a German soldier appears from between the hay bundles. Captured by Yeager's group, he tells them that he is in fact an escaped prisoner sentenced to death just like them. Although Tony and Fred want to kill him, Yeager prefers to take him along in case the Nazis attack again.

Later, the group runs into a German patrol, and the captured soldier proves very helpful. He convinces the patrol that the Americans are his prisoners, and they manage to kill part of the patrol and escape. After this, the group see a group of beautiful German nurses bathing naked in a river. Nick suggests the Americans pretend to be German soldiers, and they are able to get on friendly terms with the girls. However, after they see Fred, who is black, the nurses realize the men are Americans and start shooting at them. Tony, Nick, Berle and Fred run away to a nearby camp.

But the situation does not get any better. Some German soldiers arrive at the camp, and Yeager sends the captured soldier to talk to them. After discussing something with them, the German soldier realizes that the newly arrived are in fact Americans and shouts: "Americans! Americans!" The German soldiers kill him and Yeager's group return fire, killing the Germans. Yeager later learns he made a mistake from Colonel Buckner; the squad he shot at actually consisted of Americans dressed in Nazi uniform who were supposed to accomplish an important mission. At this point, the only solution is to trust the group led by Yeager with this task.

Meanwhile, Berle meets Nicole, a French nurse affiliated with the Resistance movement. He falls in love with her but it is Tony she is crazy about. Another problem arises as Fred falls into the enemy's hands. Yeager, Tony, Berle and Nick attack the Nazi fortifications and free their friend. After the group is reunited, Colonel Buckner explains to them the plan, according to which they are to assault an armored train shipping a prototype of the V-2 missile.

According to the plan, the train is supposed to pass a mined bridge. But there are unexpected problems as Nick is unable to contact his comrades due to a broken transmitter, and is killed in an attempt to warn them. Berle is killed by the train driver, and when all hope seems to be lost, Lieutenant Yeager decides the outcome of the battle in a heroic act, in which he blows up the train with the missiles and himself on board, destroying the station assaulted by the Nazis.

Ultimately, the only ones to survive are Fred (who is wounded but escapes into the French fields), Colonel Buckner, and Tony, who manages to return to Nicole.

Cast
 Bo Svenson as Lieutenant Robert Yeager
 Fred Williamson as Private Fred Canfield
 Peter Hooten as Tony
 Michael Pergolani as Nick Colasanti
 Jackie Basehart as Corporal Berle
 Raimund Harmstorf as Adolf Sachs
 Ian Bannen as Colonel Charles Thomas Buckner
 Michel Constantin as Veronique
 Debra Berger as Nicole
 John Loffredo as Sergeant
 Mike Morris as Wehrmacht Colonel Hauser
 Donald O'Brien as Waffen-SS Commander
 Manfred Freyberger as Waffen-SS Colonel Schrader
 Bill Vanders as Wehrmacht General

Production 
The original working title was Bastardi senza gloria (literally: "Inglorious Bastards"). The first attempt to make this movie took place in 1976 in the United States and involved an approach proposed by Bo Richards to filmmaker Ted V. Mikels.  Mikels rejected it on the grounds that a movie pitched as a Dirty Dozen follow-up was a decade late, and any insistence on preserving a title containing the word "bastard" would spell box office failure in the 1970s.

Filming took place in locations throughout Lazio, including Barbarano Romano and Castello Orsini-Odescalchi, and at Cinecittà Studios in Rome. Halfway through principal photography, the production's entire armory of prop firearms were seized by authorities, on the grounds that they could end up in the hands of terrorists, due to the recent kidnapping and murder of Prime Minister Aldo Moro by the Red Brigades. Castellari was forced to construct new blank-fire prop guns from scratch to complete the film on time.

Releases
The film was released in the United States as The Inglorious Bastards; it was also issued as Hell's Heroes and as Deadly Mission on home video. The American success of the blaxploitation genre led distributors to reedit this film and distribute it as G.I. Bro; in this version, scenes were cut to make Fred Williamson the lead character. The tagline on this version was "If you're a kraut, he'll take you out!"

The reissue title for this film was Counterfeit Commandos. Severin Films released a three-disc set that features a newly remastered transfer of the film, an interview with Quentin Tarantino (the director of the similarly titled film Inglourious Basterds) and director Enzo G. Castellari, trailers, a tour of shooting locations, a documentary on the making of the film with interviews with Bo Svenson, Fred Williamson, and Enzo G. Castellari, and a CD with the soundtrack. Both spellings appear on the DVDs: one uses the word "Bastards" while the other uses "Basterds."

Reception
The film holds a 100% rating on review aggregation website Rotten Tomatoes based on five reviews.

In a contemporary review, the Monthly Film Bulletin stated that the film is "totally lacking in realism or historical perspective" as well as that it "does boast some tolerably rousing action passages, notably the climactic sequence on the train."

See also
 Filthy Thirteen
 Macaroni Combat
 Spaghetti Western
 War film

References

External links
 
 
 
 
 Quel maledetto treno blindato at the Grindhouse Cinema Database

1978 films
1970s action war films 
Italian action adventure films
1970s Italian-language films
1970s German-language films
1970s French-language films
Films directed by Enzo G. Castellari
Films about the French Resistance
Films scored by Francesco De Masi
Macaroni Combat films
Western Front of World War II films
Italian World War II films
Films shot in Lazio
Films shot at Cinecittà Studios
1970s English-language films
1970s Italian films